Blinn College is a public junior college in Brenham, Texas, with additional campuses in Bryan, Schulenburg, and Sealy. Brenham is Blinn's main campus, with dormitories and apartments.

History

Blinn was established as Mission Institute in 1884 by the Southern German Conference of the Methodist denomination. It became coeducational in 1888 when it began admitting women. In 1889, the institute's name was changed to Blinn Memorial College in honor of the Reverend Christian Blinn of New York, who had donated a considerable sum of money to make the school possible. In 1927, the Board of Trustees, under leadership of President Philip Deschner, organized a junior college. In 1930, Blinn merged with Southwestern University of Georgetown, Texas. In 1934, a new charter was procured by the citizens of Brenham, and a private nonsectarian junior college was organized as Blinn College with nine regents as the board of control. In February 1937, all connections with Southwestern University and the Methodist denominations were severed.

On June 8, 1937, voters in Washington County levied a property tax for the creation of a public junior college district. Blinn thus became the first county-owned junior college district in Texas. The college continues to operate as one of the largest of some fifty public community college districts in Texas.  After some early struggles (including the campus nearly closing in 1946 due to fiscal issues), the college began to grow and do well under the leadership of Dr. Thomas Morris Spencer, one of the early public junior college pioneers in Texas.  When he left the college in 1957 it was on a firm fiscal footing.

The Bryan campus was established in 1970, and by the early 1980s, a third campus opened in College Station. In 1997, the Villa Maria Road campus opened consolidating the programs that were located in the Townshire Shopping Center in Bryan and the Woodstone Center in College Station. The third Brazos County site, located in the former Bryan post office, continues to house the dental hygiene, radiologic technology, and workforce education programs. The original three buildings on the Bryan campuses were expanded to six, and in 2002, the former Schulman Theater was purchased and converted to classroom space, known as the College Park Campus (CPC). The Schulenburg campus opened in 1997 and Sealy in 2005.

In 2017 Blinn College collaborated with Texas A&M University on the university's newly constructed RELLIS Campus at Bryan Air Force Base. (RELLIS is an acronym of "Respect", "Excellence", "Leadership", "Loyalty", "Integrity", and "Selfless service".) Blinn College expected to invest $34 million in the site. The groundbreaking ceremony for the Blinn College educational building took place on March 31, 2017.

Service area
According to the Texas Legislature, Blinn's service area includes the counties of Brazos, Burleson, Grimes, Madison, Washington, and Waller. It serves Austin County except for sections in Wallis-Orchard ISD, Fayette County except for sections in Smithville ISD, and Lee County except for sections in Elgin ISD. Additionally it serves sections of the counties of:
 Bastrop (portions in Lexington ISD)
 Milam (portions in Gause ISD, Lexington ISD, and Milano ISD)
 Montgomery (portions in Richards ISD)
 Robertson (portions in Bryan ISD, Franklin ISD, Hearne ISD, and Mumford ISD)
 Walker (portions in Richards ISD)
 Willamson (portions in Lexington ISD)

Academic transfer
Blinn boasts the highest transfer rate in the state of Texas, sending students to institutions such as Texas A&M University, Sam Houston State University, Texas State University, the University of Texas and the University of Houston. Its transfer rate to four-year universities is 49% compared to the state average of 27%. Blinn transfers more students to Texas A&M University than any other two-year college. Blinn technical students score among the best in the state on board and licensure exams.

Blinn and Texas A&M University established the first co-enrollment program of its kind with the TEAM (Transfer Enrollment at Texas A&M) Program.

In 2013, the program was awarded the Texas Higher Education Coordinating Board's Recognition of Excellence, and in 2014 it received the THECB Star Award.

Community impact

A 2014 study found that Blinn made a $345.3 million impact in its service area, including $239.5 million in added income by former students employed in the regional workforce, $61.3 million in College operations spending and $44.5 million in student spending. The report found that Blinn has made an impact of $247.4 million in Bryan-College Station, $83 million in Brenham, $11.1 million in Schulenburg and $3.9 million in Sealy.

Blinn has also been recognized for its community service. In 2011, Blinn received the Carnegie Foundation for the Advancement of Teaching Community Engagement Classification, and in 2012 it was the only community college in the state of Texas to be named to the President's Higher Education Community Service Honor Roll. Each year, Blinn devotes a day to community service, called the Blinn Blitz, and hundreds of students participate in local community service projects.

Athletics
The home campus in Brenham has offered intercollegiate athletics since 1903 and has won 30 national championships since 1987. The Blinn Buccaneers play football, men's and women's basketball, baseball, softball and volleyball. The football program won NJCAA championships in 1995, 1996, 2006, and 2009, the last of which was won with Cam Newton.  The volleyball team won the NJCAA championship in 2008, 2011, 2013 and 2014. The softball team consistently makes the national tournament. Blinn's award-winning cheer and dance teams won the UCA and UDA National Championships in 2014 and 2015.

Notable alumni
Chris "Birdman" Andersen, professional basketball player
Josh Ashton, professional football player
John Baker, professional football player
Don Baylor, Major League Baseball Player, MVP 1979
Josh Beckett (class of 1999), MLB Pitcher, World Series MVP (2003), ALCS MVP (2007), 2-Time World Series Champion, Pitched a No-Hitter (2014)
James Beckford, won silver medal in long jump at 2004 Olympics
Big Moe, rapper
Michael Bishop, professional football player, quarterback in the CFL, former Kansas State All-American
Lyle Blackwood, professional football player
Chris Brazzell, professional football player
Eric Brown, professional football player
Shockmain Davis, professional football player
Tim Denton, professional football player
Danny Gray, professional football player
Mike Green, professional football player
Roderick Green, professional football player
Marion Grice, professional football player
Ty Hardin, actor on television series Bronco
Chris Johnson, professional football player
James Johnson, professional football player
Dan Kubiak (Class of 1959), State representative from Rockdale, 1969-1983 and 1991-1998
Oliver Lafayette, professional basketball player
Abraham Louis Levin (Class of 1903), physician and inventor of the Levin Tube which is still widely used in surgery
Tim Montgomery, sprinter, 2000 Olympics, 1999 World Championships 400-meter relay gold medals
Quincy Morgan, former professional football player; wide receiver in the NFL, former Kansas State All-American
Shane Nelson, former professional football player of the Buffalo Bills
Cam Newton, 2010 Heisman Trophy winner after transfer, where he won the 2011 BCS National Championship Game with the Auburn Tigers. Number 1 pick in the 2011 NFL Draft by the Carolina Panthers, and 2015 NFL MVP.
Damion Ratley, professional football player
Khiry Robinson, professional football player; running back in the NFL for the New York Jets
Bernard Scott, professional football player
Kendall Sheffield, professional football player
Godfrey Siamusiye, distance runner
Vantz Singletary, NFL and college football coach
Tony Skinn, college basketball player
Henry Thomas, actor starred in E.T.; attended the Bryan campus for one year
Leon Toubin, member of Blinn College's board of trustees
Justin Tuggle, professional football player
Dede Westbrook, professional football player
James Wright, professional football player

See also

National Register of Historic Places listings in Washington County, Texas
Recorded Texas Historic Landmarks in Washington County

References

External links

Blinn College

 
University and college buildings on the National Register of Historic Places in Texas
Mission Revival architecture in Texas
Buildings designated early commercial in the National Register of Historic Places
1884 establishments in Texas
National Register of Historic Places in Washington County, Texas
Two-year colleges in the United States
Universities and colleges accredited by the Southern Association of Colleges and Schools
Community colleges in Texas
Buildings and structures in Brenham, Texas
NJCAA athletics
Brenham, Texas
Bryan, Texas
Libraries participating in TexShare
Education in Austin County, Texas
Education in Brazos County, Texas
Education in Bastrop County, Texas
Education in Burleson County, Texas
Education in Fayette County, Texas
Education in Grimes County, Texas
Education in Lee County, Texas
Education in Madison County, Texas
Education in Milam County, Texas
Education in Montgomery County, Texas
Education in Robertson County, Texas
Education in Waller County, Texas
Education in Washington County, Texas
Education in Williamson County, Texas